Rafael Nadal defeated Novak Djokovic in the final, 7–6(8–6), 7–5 to win the singles tennis title at the 2008 Queen's Club Championships.

Andy Roddick was the defending champion, but lost in the semifinals to Nadal. This marked the first time since 1999 that neither Lleyton Hewitt nor Roddick won the title.

Seeds
The top eight seeds receive a bye into the second round.

Draw

Finals

Top half

Section 1

Section 2

Bottom half

Section 3

Section 4

External links
 Main draw
 Qualifying draw

Singles